Hulkund is a village in Belgaum district in the southern state of Karnataka, India.

It has Ramlingeswar Temple.

Late Dr S V Patil, Renowned Agronomist and Former Vice Chancellor of University of Agricultural Sciences was native of Hulkund.

References

Villages in Belagavi district